The men's foil was a fencing event held as part of the fencing at the 1904 Summer Olympics programme. It was the third time the event was held at the Olympics. The competition was held on September 7, 1904. Nine fencers from three nations competed. The event was won by Ramón Fonst of Cuba, the silver medal went to Albertson Van Zo Post and the bronze to Charles Tatham, both of United States.

Background

This was the third appearance of the event, which has been held at every Summer Olympics except 1908 (when there was a foil display only rather than a medal event). None of the fencers from 1900 returned.

Two of the three competing nations were making their debut in the men's foil: Cuba and Germany. Only the United States had previously competed, in 1900; the United States' two appearances matched France (1896 and 1900).

Competition format

The event used a two-round format (semifinals and a final). The semifinal consisted of two pools, one of five fencers and one of four fencers, with each pool playing a round-robin. The top two in each semifinal advanced to the final; these four played another round-robin. Standard foil rules were used, including that touches had to be made with the tip of the foil, the target area was limited to the torso, and priority determined the winner of double touches. 

However, the number of touches made was not determinative of the winner of a bout. Instead, each bout was evaluated by judges. Each judge assigned up to 100 points to each fencer, with the fencer having the higher average score winning the bout.

Schedule

Results

Semifinals

Each fencer in a group faced each other fencer in that group once. The top two fencers in each semifinal group moved on to the final.

Semifinal A

Semifinal B

Final

Fonst continued to defeat all comers, including Post a second time, to win the gold. Post's only two losses in the event came against Fonst, as he took silver. Tatham, who had lost to Casmir in the semifinal pool, defeated him the second time around to take third place.

Final classification

Notes

Sources

 

Fencing at the 1904 Summer Olympics